The 2020 Vermont gubernatorial election was held on November 3, 2020, to elect the Governor of Vermont. As Vermont does not impose term limits upon its governors, incumbent Republican Governor Phil Scott was eligible to run for reelection to a third two-year term in office. On November 18, 2019, he confirmed that he was running for reelection, but did not yet publicly announce his campaign. On May 28, 2020, he officially announced his candidacy but stated that he would not campaign, maintain a campaign staff, or fundraise because of the state of emergency due to the COVID-19 pandemic in Vermont. The primary was held on August 11. Scott won re-election to a third term in a landslide, defeating Progressive and Democratic nominee, Lieutenant Governor David Zuckerman. 

Scott's 41-point victory margin was the largest in a Vermont gubernatorial election since 1996 and the largest for a Republican candidate since 1950, even while Democrat Joe Biden carried the state by a more than the 35-point margin in the concurrent presidential election which was his strongest performance in the nation. Scott would improve upon his performance again in 2022.

Republican primary

Candidates

Nominee
 Phil Scott, incumbent Governor of Vermont

Eliminated in primary
 John Klar, lawyer and pastor
 Bernard Peters, independent candidate for governor in 2014 and for state representative in 1986
 Emily Peyton, independent candidate for governor in 2012 and 2014, Liberty Union nominee for governor in 2018
 Douglas Cavett

Results

Democratic primary

Candidates

Nominee
 David Zuckerman, Lieutenant Governor of Vermont, former member of the Vermont Senate, former member of the Vermont House of Representatives, farmer, businessman, environmentalist (Zuckerman has elected to use the Progressive Party ballot line in the general election, listing the Democratic Party as a secondary nomination under Vermont's electoral fusion system.)

Eliminated in primary 
 Rebecca Holcombe, former Vermont Education Secretary
 Ralph "Carcajou" Corbo, former Rural Carrier for USPS, activist, Wallingford resident, and 2020 candidate for Vermont's at-large congressional district
 Patrick Winburn, Bennington attorney

Declined
 T. J. Donovan, Attorney General of Vermont (running for re-election)
 Christine Hallquist, former CEO of the Vermont Electric Cooperative and nominee for governor in 2018

Endorsements

Debates & forums
CCTV Channel 17 Town Meeting TV - Democratic Primary Gubernatorial Forum 7/16/2020
Brattleboro Community TV - Democratic Governor Candidate Debate 5/11/2020

Results

Progressive Party
Leaders within the Progressive Party endorsed David Zuckerman for the gubernatorial election, advocating for Zuckerman to be elected with write-in voters. The party has stated that if Cris Ericson won the primary, "they would likely issue a 'non-endorsement.'" On election night the progressive nomination was listed as too close to call. Zuckerman was confirmed to have won the nomination a few days later when the final write-in vote count was confirmed.

Nominee
 David Zuckerman, Lieutenant Governor of Vermont, former member of the Vermont Senate, former member of the Vermont House of Representatives, farmer, businessman, environmentalist

Eliminated in primary 
 Cris Ericson, marijuana legalization activist, perennial candidate, and candidate for Governor in 2002, 2004, 2010, 2012, 2016, and 2018, candidate for US Senator in 2004, 2010, 2012 and 2016, candidate for US Representative in 2018 also ran for other statewide offices.
 Boots Wardinski, Newbury resident, Liberty Union nominee for lieutenant governor in 2016

Results

General election

Candidates
 Wayne Billado III (I), also ran for lieutenant governor, state senator from Franklin County, and state representative from Franklin 3-1 district
 Michael A. Devost (I)
 Charly Dickerson (I)
 Kevin Hoyt (I), Republican nominee for state representative from Bennington 2-1 in 2018
 Emily Peyton (I), candidate for governor in 2012, 2014, and 2018
 Phil Scott (R), incumbent governor, former lieutenant governor and state senator, construction company owner
 Erynn Hazlett Whitney (I)
 David Zuckerman (P/D), lieutenant governor, former member of State Legislature, farmer, businessman, environmentalist

Predictions

Polling

with Rebecca Holcombe

Endorsements

Debates & forums
VTDigger Governor Forum 9/29/2020

Results

 

Counties that flipped from Democratic to Republican
 Windham (largest municipality: Brattleboro)

Notes

References

External links
Official campaign websites
 Phil Scott (R) for Governor
 David Zuckerman (P/D) for Governor

2020
Governor
Vermont